Pastina (Italian: literally, "little pasta") is a variety of pasta consisting of tiny pieces of pasta, typically of a round (irregular) shape with a diameter of about 1.6 millimetres (1/16"). It is the smallest type of pasta produced. It is made of wheat flour and may also include egg. In Italy, pastina is a general term referring to many small shapes of pasta. In North America, however, the term pastina is usually used to refer to one type of pastina: "stellina." 

Pastina is used in many different ways in Italian cuisine, including as an ingredient of soup, desserts, infant food and also, alone, as a distinct and unique pasta dish.  

Ronzoni, the flagship brand of New World Pasta, discontinued its use of pastina in January 2023.

See also
List of pasta
Italian cuisine

References 

Types of pasta
Italian cuisine